Teleia (Greek for Full stop) was a Greek political party which was founded in 2014 by actor and mayor of Stylida Apostle Gletsos. the party was founded on December 8, 2014 in Anogia.

Candidates
On January 9, 2015, the party put forwards the candidates for the January 2015 Greek legislative elections.

Election results

References

External links
 Official website of Teleia

Political parties established in 2014
2014 establishments in Greece
Political parties in Greece